Edward Sinnott "Tex" O'Reilly (15 August 1880 – 9 December 1946) was an American soldier of fortune, writer, journalist, and film actor. He is said to have fought in ten wars under many flags. Initially serving in the U.S. Army in the Spanish–American War, the Philippine–American War, and the Boxer Rebellion, he would claim to fight in several conflicts in Central America and to have fought with Pancho Villa in Mexico and claimed to have fought in the Rif War with the Spanish Foreign Legion in North Africa. He worked as a reporter for the Associated Press. He wrote an autobiography, Roving and Fighting, and Lowell Thomas wrote Born to Raise Hell about him.  The latter book has been reprinted and is distributed by The Long Riders' Guild Press. He was the author of Pecos Bill.

Early life 
Edward O'Reilly was born in Denton, Texas in 1880. His father worked as a construction worker and the family would frequently move around looking for work. When there was no work, they would settle down in a ranch they live in near San Saba. Growing up in the 'Wild West' had a profound effect on him, and he grew up learning how to ride, shoot, and survive in the wilderness. He was once sent into town by his mother when he witnessed a shootout in which seven people were shot. His family eventually decided to move to Chicago due to the violence.

While living in here, O'Reilly first heard news about the USS Maine sinking in the port of Havana in February 1898. This event motivated him to join the Army, having to lie about his age to join without his parents permission since he was only 17 at the time. He was enrolled Company B of the 4th Infantry Regiment and sent to Tampa, Florida after training before being deployed to Cuba.

Spanish-American War 
After arriving in Cuba, the extreme heat and constant mosquitos were a major problem. O'Reilly also claimed the extremely poor quality rations were "a slimy, ill-smelling mess, disgusting in appearance and fatal in effect." He first witnessed action in The Battle of El Caney. The battle was a failure for the American side and O'Reilly described the chaos the battle degenerated into. Shelling from Spanish artillery's had disoriented him, and how the heat and lack of water lead to some of his comrades fighting each other over canteens in the middle of the battle. He jumped into a trench where a Spanish soldier raised his gun on him, only to be saved at the last second when a Black American soldier killed him at the last second.

After this, O'Reilly claimed to have never seen a Spanish soldier again, but that he and his fellow soldiers were under constant fire from them from the surrounding jungle. After the Battle of San Juan Hill and the decisive American victory at the Battle of Santiago de Cuba, the Spanish surrendered soon after. O'Reilly's company was stationed in Cuba for another month after the Spanish surrender where he noted that lack of supplies led to soldiers fighting over the few food rations left.

Bibliography
 O'Reilly, Edward S.; Roving and Fighting: Adventures Under Four Flags; The Century Co., New York (1918), republished Kessinger Publishing (2012)
 O'Reilly, Edward S. and Thomas, Lowell; Born to Raise Hell; The Unbelievable but True Life Story of an Infamous Soldier of Fortune; The Long Riders' Guild Press (2001)
 Edward Sinnott O'Reilly, Pecos Bill (New York: Ridgway, 1935).

External links

American mercenaries
1880 births
1946 deaths
Associated Press reporters
American military personnel of the Spanish–American War
American military personnel of the Philippine–American War
American military personnel of the Boxer Rebellion
American writers
American short story writers
Cowboys
Pecos Bill